Together We Stand, also known as Nothing Is Easy, is an American sitcom that aired on the CBS network from 1986 to 1987. It was written by Stephen Sustarsic and directed by Andrew D. Weyman.

Together We Stand is about a married couple, David (Elliott Gould) and Lori Randall (Dee Wallace), and their array of adopted children from all walks of life. According to producer Sherwood Schwartz, the plot for this show was originally written as a spin-off of The Brady Bunch called Kelly's Kids. In the January 4, 1974, episode of The Brady Bunch, also titled "Kelly's Kids" (season 5, episode 14), which served as a backdoor pilot, the Bradys' neighbors plan to adopt one child but end up adopting three boys of different ethnicities.

Summary
David Randall (Elliott Gould) and his wife Lori (Dee Wallace) had two kids, adopted daughter Amy (Katie O'Neill) and biological son Jack (Scott Grimes). After seeing how well the Randall family did with an adopted child and a biological child, a pushy social worker (Edie McClurg) gives them two more children: an Asian-American boy named Sam (Ke Huy Quan) and a little African-American girl named Sally (Natasha Bobo). The story lines centered on the cultural differences and adjustments that had to be made by all: Sam and Sally having parents for the first time, and Jack and Amy competing with the new arrivals for their parents' time and affection. After six episodes, Gould's character was killed off, and the series focused on Lori's struggles as a single mother.

Cast
 Elliott Gould as David Randall (in Together We Stand only)
 Dee Wallace as Lori Randall
 Scott Grimes as Jack Randall
 Katie O'Neill as Amy Randall
 Ke Huy Quan (credited as Jonathan Ke Quan) as Sam Randall
 Natasha Bobo as Sally Randall
 Julia Migenes as Marion Simmons (in Nothing Is Easy only)

Episodes

Together We Stand (1986)

Nothing Is Easy (1987)

Network run
Premiering on Monday, September 22, 1986, at 8:30 PM ET after Kate and Allie where its ratings were initially strong, Together We Stand moved to Wednesdays at 8:00 PM ET beginning on October 1 to make room for My Sister Sam, putting it up against ABC's Perfect Strangers and NBC's Highway to Heaven instead. When the show's ratings plunged, CBS pulled the series after six episodes had aired.

The show returned three months later with a new title – Nothing Is Easy – new opening credits, a new time slot (Sundays at 9:30 PM ET, after Designing Women and up against movies on the other two networks), a new theme song, and a new cast member – Julia Migenes as bitter divorced neighbor Marion Simmons. Elliott Gould did not appear in the revamped series – his character was killed off in an automobile accident, and Dee Wallace-Stone continued on as a single mother. After two weeks in that time slot, it went on hiatus again for a month only to resurface on Fridays at 8:00 PM beginning on March 27, competing with ABC's The Charmings and NBC's Roomies. The revamp lasted only for a total of seven episodes before CBS cancelled it for good. The remaining six unaired episodes are not known to have aired anywhere.

References

External links 
 
 Television Obscurities
 TVGuide.com - Together We Stand
 TV.com - Together We Stand

1986 American television series debuts
1987 American television series endings
1980s American sitcoms
CBS original programming
Television series about families
Television series by Universal Television
Television series created by Michael Jacobs
Television shows set in Portland, Oregon